The First Distiller, subtitled How the Imp Earned a Crust, is a play by Leo Tolstoy published in 1886, and translated into English by Aylmer and Louise Maude.

According to academic Andrew Donskov, The First Distiller was an anti-alcohol morality play, based on Tolstoy's short story Promoting a Devil, that drew upon numerous literary themes already present in Russian literature in the 1860s, such as A. F. Pogossky's 1861 story of the same title.

It was first translated into French by the famous Polish translator Téodor de Wyzewa in November 1886.

Text online

Russian 
 Первый винокур, или Как чертенок краюшку выкупал, from rvb.ru

English 
 The First Distiller: A Comedy in Six Acts, from RevoltLib.com
 The First Distiller, from Marxists.org
 The First Distiller, from TheAnarchistLibrary.org
 The First Distiller, from Project Gutenberg

References

Further reading
Nikolay Leskov, "Откуда заимствован сюжет пьесы графа Л. Н. Толстого «Первый винокур»", In: Лесков Н. С. Собрание сочинений в 11 томах. М.: ГИХЛ, 1957. vol. 11. pp. 132–133.

Plays by Leo Tolstoy
1886 plays